The 2022 New York Mets season was the 61st season in the franchise's history, 14th at Citi Field, and second under majority owner Steve Cohen.

On December 2, 2021, Commissioner of Baseball Rob Manfred announced a lockout of players, following expiration of the collective bargaining agreement (CBA) between the league and the Major League Baseball Players Association (MLBPA). On March 10, 2022, the MLB and MLBPA agreed to a new collective bargaining agreement, thus ending the lockout. Opening Day was played on April 7. Although MLB previously announced that several series would be cancelled due to the lockout, the agreement provides for a 162-game season, with originally canceled games to be made up via doubleheaders.

On April 15, the Mets unveiled a long-awaited statue of legendary pitcher Tom Seaver by the main entrance to Citi Field. The statue which features Seaver's iconic drop-and-drive delivery, stands to the right of the Home Run Apple. It measures 10 feet high, 13½ feet long and is made of 2,000 pounds of bronze and 1,200 pounds of stainless steel, and stands on a granite mound. "The Franchise" statue came in nine separate pieces, weighs 33,600 pounds and was sculpted by William Behrends.

On July 9, the Mets retired Keith Hernandez's No. 17, which is immortalized on the left field overhang at Citi Field. He became the 7th Mets player to be honored.

On August 27, the Mets retired the No. 24 jersey once worn by Hall of Fame outfielder Willie Mays as part of their Old Timers' Day ceremonies. Mays finished his historic career with the Mets. He became the 8th Mets player to have his number retired.

On September 19, the Mets clinched their first playoff appearance since 2016. It was their 10th playoff berth in franchise history.

After leading the National League East for most of the season (at one point, the team had a  game lead in the division), the Mets endured an underwhelming September. A resurgent Atlanta Braves team, which also swept the Mets in the final weekend of the regular season, won the NL East, leaving the Mets to settle with the first Wild Card spot.  

On October 4, the Mets earned their 100th win of the season, the team's fourth 100-win season in franchise history and their first since 1988. They ended the season 101–61, the second most wins in a season in franchise history behind only the championship team of 1986.

The Mets were defeated in the Wild Card Series by the San Diego Padres, losing in three games. The Mets are the first team in MLB history to produce only one hit in a winner-take-all playoff game. In addition to being the eighteenth 100-win team to not win a postseason series, they became the first 100+ win team to fail to reach the Division Series since it was put into effect in 1995.

Offseason

Lockout 

The expiration of the league's collective bargaining agreement (CBA) with the Major League Baseball Players Association occurred on December 1, 2021 with no new agreement in place. As a result, the team owners voted unanimously to lockout the players stopping all free agency and trades. 

The parties came to an agreement on a new CBA on March 10, 2022.

Rule changes 
Pursuant to the new CBA, several new rules were instituted for the 2022 season. The National League will adopt the designated hitter full-time, a draft lottery will be implemented, the postseason will expand from ten teams to twelve, and advertising patches will appear on player uniforms and helmets for the first time.

Transactions

2021
November 24 – Signed center field prospect Nick Plummer to a 1-year, $570,500 Major League contract.
 November 27 – Signed center fielder Starling Marte to a 4-year, $78 million contract; outfielder Mark Canha to a 2-year, $26.5 million contract (with a 3-year option); and infielder Eduardo Escobar to a $20 million contract.
 December 1 – Signed three-time Cy Young Award-winning pitcher Max Scherzer to a 3-year, $130 million contract.

2022
 March 12 – Acquired right-handed pitcher Chris Bassitt from the Oakland Athletics for pitching prospects Adam Oller and J.T. Ginn.
 March 13 – Signed Adam Ottavino to 1-year deal worth $4 million with $1 million in performance incentives.
April 3 – Acquired left-handed reliever Joely Rodríguez from the New York Yankees in exchange for right-handed reliever Miguel Castro.

Regular season

Transactions

2022
July 22 – Acquired first baseman/designated hitter Daniel Vogelbach from the Pittsburgh Pirates in exchange for rookie reliever Colin Holderman.
July 28 – Acquired outfielder Tyler Naquin and left-handed reliever Phillip Diehl from the Cincinnati Reds in exchange for minor leaguers right-handed pitcher José Acuña and outfielder Hector Rodríguez.
August 2 – Acquired outfielder Darin Ruf from the San Francisco Giants in exchange for infielder J.D. Davis and three minor league pitching prospects: left-handed pitchers Thomas Szapucki and Nick Zwack, and right-handed pitcher Carson Seymour.
August 2 – Acquired right-handed relief pitcher Mychal Givens from the Chicago Cubs in exchange for minor league right-handed pitching prospect Saul Gonzalez.

Roster

Standings

National League East

National League Wild Card

Record vs. opponents

Game log

Regular season

|- style="background:#bfb;" 
| 1 || April 7 || @ Nationals || 5–1 || Megill (1–0) || Corbin (0–1) || — || Nationals Park (35,052) || 1–0
|- style="background:#bfb;" 
| 2 || April 8 || @ Nationals || 7–3 || Scherzer (1–0) || Gray (0–1) || — || Nationals Park (25,677) || 2–0
|- style="background:#bfb;"
| 3 || April 9 || @ Nationals || 5–0 || Bassitt (1–0) || Adon (0–1) || — || Nationals Park (21,369) || 3–0
|- style="background:#fbb;" 
| 4 || April 10 || @ Nationals || 2–4 || Finnegan (1-0) || Williams (0–1) || Rainey (1) || Nationals Park (23,158) || 3–1
|- style="background:#fbb;" 
| 5 || April 11 || @ Phillies || 4–5 || Domínguez (1–0) || Lugo (0–1) || Hand (1) || Citizens Bank Park (22,317) || 3–2
|- style="background:#bfb;"
| 6 || April 12 || @ Phillies || 2–0 || Megill (2–0) || Wheeler (0–1) || Díaz (1) || Citizens Bank Park (26,045) || 4–2
|- style="background:#bfb;" 
| 7 || April 13 || @ Phillies || 9–6 || Scherzer (2–0) || Nola (1–1) || — || Citizens Bank Park (31,190) || 5–2
|- style="background:#bfb;" 
| 8 || April 15 || Diamondbacks || 10–3 || Bassitt (2–0) || Davies (0–1) || — || Citi Field (43,820) || 6–2
|- style="background:#fbb;" 
| 9 || April 16 || Diamondbacks || 2–3 || Poppen (1–0) || Rodríguez (0–1) || Melancon (1) || Citi Field (37,935) || 6–3
|- style="background:#bfb;" 
| 10 || April 17 || Diamondbacks || 5–0 || Shreve (1–0) || Ramirez (0–1) || — || Citi Field (24,515) || 7–3
|- style="background:#bbb;" 
| — || April 18 || Giants || colspan=7| Postponed (rain); rescheduled for April 19
|- style="background:#bfb;" 
| 11 || April 19  || Giants || 5–4  || Ottavino (1–0) || García (1–1) || — || Citi Field (N/A) || 8–3
|- style="background:#bfb;" 
| 12 || April 19  || Giants || 3–1 || Scherzer (3–0) || Webb (1–1) || May (1) || Citi Field (27,490) || 9–3
|- style="background:#fbb;" 
| 13 || April 20 || Giants || 2–5 || Rodón (2–0) || Bassitt (2–1) || McGee (2) || Citi Field (30,050) || 9–4
|- style="background:#bfb;" 
| 14 || April 21 || Giants || 6–2 || Carrasco (1–0) || DeSclafani (0–1) || — || Citi Field (28,760) || 10–4
|- style="background:#bfb;" 
| 15 || April 22 || @ Diamondbacks || 6–5  || Díaz (1–0) || Melancon (0–2) || Lugo (1) || Chase Field (20,939) || 11–4
|- style="background:#fbb;" 
| 16 || April 23 || @ Diamondbacks || 2–5 || Castellanos (1–0) || Williams (0–2) || Mantiply (1) || Chase Field (25,413) || 11–5
|- style="background:#bfb;" 
| 17 || April 24 || @ Diamondbacks || 6–2 || Megill (3–0) || Wendelken (0–1) || — || Chase Field (23,570) || 12–5
|- style="background:#bfb;" 
| 18 || April 25 || @ Cardinals || 5–2 || May (1–0) || Gallegos (0–1) || Díaz (2) || Busch Stadium (35,455) || 13–5
|- style="background:#bfb;" 
| 19 || April 26 || @ Cardinals || 3–0 || Bassitt (3–1) || Hicks (1–2) || Díaz (3) || Busch Stadium (32,215) || 14–5
|- style="background:#fbb;" 
| 20 || April 27 || @ Cardinals || 5–10 || Woodford (1–0) || Carrasco (1–1) || — || Busch Stadium (34,822) || 14–6
|- style="background:#bfb;" 
| 21 || April 29 || Phillies || 3–0 || Megill (4–0) || Nola (1–3) || Díaz (4) || Citi Field (32,416) || 15–6
|- style="background:#fbb;" 
| 22 || April 30 || Phillies || 1–4 || Norwood (1–0) || Ottavino (1–1) || Knebel (4) || Citi Field (40,036) || 15–7
|-

|- style="background:#bfb;" 
| 23 || May 1 || Phillies || 10–6 || Scherzer (4–0) || Eflin (1–2) || — || Citi Field (30,608) || 16–7
|- style="background:#fbb;" 
| 24 || May 2 || Braves || 2–5 || Fried (3–2) || Bassitt (3–2) || Jansen (7) || Citi Field (23,413) || 16–8
|- style="background:#bfb;" 
| 25 || May 3  || Braves || 5–4 || Peterson (1–0) || Morton (1–3) || Díaz (5) || Citi Field (N/A) || 17–8
|- style="background:#bfb;"
| 26 || May 3  || Braves || 3–0 || Carrasco (2–1) || Wright (3–1) || Lugo (2) || Citi Field (27,206) || 18–8
|- style="background:#fbb;" 
| 27 || May 4 || Braves || 2–9 || Anderson (3–1) || Megill (4–1) || — || Citi Field (23,973) || 18–9
|- style="background:#bfb;" 
| 28 || May 5 || @ Phillies || 8–7 || Medina (1–0) || Knebel (0–2) || Díaz (6) || Citizens Bank Park (24,040) || 19–9
|- style="background:#bbb;" 
| — || May 6 || @ Phillies || colspan=7| Postponed (rain); rescheduled for August 20
|- style="background:#bbb;" 
| — || May 7 || @ Phillies || colspan=7| Postponed (rain); rescheduled for May 8
|- style="background:#fbb;" 
| 29 || May 8  || @ Phillies || 2–3 || Gibson (3–1) || Scherzer (4–1) || Knebel (5) || Citizens Bank Park (N/A) || 19–10
|- style="background:#bfb;" 
| 30 || May 8  || @ Phillies || 6–1 || Bassitt (4–2) || Sánchez (0–1) || — || Citizens Bank Park (37,133) || 20–10
|- style="background:#bfb;" 
| 31 || May 10 || @ Nationals || 4–2 || Carrasco (3–1) || Edwards Jr. (0–1) || Díaz (7) || Nationals Park (21,955) || 21–10
|- style="background:#fbb;" 
| 32 || May 11 || @ Nationals || 3–8 || Sanchez (2–2) || Megill (4–2) || — || Nationals Park (19,715) || 21–11
|- style="background:#bfb;" 
| 33 || May 12 || @ Nationals || 4–1 || Walker (1–0) || Adon (1–6) || — || Nationals Park (21,213) || 22–11
|- style="background:#fbb;" 
| 34 || May 13 || Mariners || 1–2 || Sewald (2–1) || Smith (0–1) || Steckenrider (2) || Citi Field (36,629) || 22–12
|- style="background:#bfb;" 
| 35 || May 14 || Mariners || 5–4 || Ottavino (2–1) || Muñoz (1–1) || Díaz (8) || Citi Field (37,140) || 23–12
|- style="background:#fbb;" 
| 36 || May 15 || Mariners || 7–8 || Ray (4–3) || Shreve (1–1) || Castillo (2) || Citi Field (38,476) || 23–13
|- style="background:#bbb;" 
| — || May 16 || Cardinals || colspan=7| Postponed (rain); rescheduled for May 17
|- style="background:#bfb;" 
| 37 || May 17  || Cardinals || 3–1 || Reed (1–0) || Mikolas (3–2) || Díaz (9) || Citi Field (N/A) || 24–13
|- style="background:#fbb;" 
| 38 || May 17  || Cardinals || 3–4 || Helsley (2–0) || Rodríguez (0–2) || Gallegos (7) || Citi Field (27,457) || 24–14
|- style="background:#bfb;" 
| 39 || May 18 || Cardinals || 11–4 || Scherzer (5–1) || Walsh (0–1) || — || Citi Field (32,798) || 25–14
|- style="background:#bfb;" 
| 40 || May 19 || Cardinals || 7–6  || Holderman (1–0) || Gallegos (0–2) || — || Citi Field (28,801) || 26–14
|- style="background:#bbb;" 
| — || May 20 || @ Rockies || colspan=7| Postponed (snow); rescheduled for May 21
|- style="background:#bfb;" 
| 41 || May 21  || @ Rockies || 5–1 || Carrasco (4–1) || Márquez (1–4) || — || Coors Field (20,737) || 27–14
|- style="background:#fbb;" 
| 42 || May 21  || @ Rockies || 3–11 || Goudeau (1–0) || Williams (0–3) || — || Coors Field (25,783) || 27–15
|- style="background:#bfb;"
| 43 || May 22 || @ Rockies || 2–0 || Walker (2–0) || Gomber (2–4) || Díaz (10) || Coors Field (35,248) || 28–15
|- style="background:#bfb;" 
| 44 || May 23 || @ Giants || 13–3 || Peterson (2–0) || Cobb (3–2) || — || Oracle Park (25,690) || 29–15
|- style="background:#fbb;"
| 45 || May 24 || @ Giants || 12–13 || Brebbia (2–0) || Díaz (1–1) || — || Oracle Park (27,683) || 29–16
|- style="background:#fbb;"
| 46 || May 25 || @ Giants || 3–9 || Junis (2–1) || Szapucki (0–1) || — || Oracle Park (27,432) || 29–17
|- style="background:#bfb;" 
| 47 || May 27 || Phillies || 8–6 || Carrasco (5–1) || Falter (0–2) || Díaz (11) || Citi Field (30,175) || 30–17
|- style="background:#bfb;" 
| 48 || May 28 || Phillies || 8–2 || Walker (3–0) || Eflin (1–4) || — || Citi Field (37,455) || 31–17
|- style="background:#bfb;" 
| 49 || May 29 || Phillies || 5–4  || Díaz (2–1) || Knebel (1–4) || — || Citi Field (36,513) || 32–17
|- style="background:#bfb;"
| 50 || May 30 || Nationals || 13–5 || Holderman (2–0) || Fedde (3–4) || — || Citi Field (22,007) || 33–17
|- style="background:#bfb;"
| 51 || May 31 || Nationals || 10–0 || Williams (1–3) || Corbin (1–8) || — || Citi Field (25,263) || 34–17
|-

|- style="background:#bfb;"
| 52 || June 1 || Nationals || 5–0 || Carrasco (6–1) || Lee (0–1) || — || Citi Field (25,417) || 35–17
|- style="background:#fbb;" 
| 53 || June 2 || @ Dodgers || 0–2 || Gonsolin (6–0) || Walker (3–1) || Kimbrel (11) || Dodger Stadium (48,018) || 35–18
|- style="background:#fbb;" 
| 54 || June 3 || @ Dodgers || 1–6 || Anderson (7–0) || Bassitt (4–3) || — || Dodger Stadium (52,505) || 35–19
|- style="background:#bfb;" 
| 55 || June 4 || @ Dodgers || 9–4 || Holderman (3–0) || Buehler (6–2) || — || Dodger Stadium (50,165) || 36–19
|- style="background:#bfb;" 
| 56 || June 5 || @ Dodgers || 5–4  || Lugo (1–1) || Kimbrel (0–2) || Medina (1) || Dodger Stadium (48,672) || 37–19
|- style="background:#bfb;" 
| 57 || June 6 || @ Padres || 11–5 || Carrasco (7–1) || Snell (0–3) || — || Petco Park (34,858) || 38–19
|- style="background:#fbb;"
| 58 || June 7 || @ Padres || 0–7 || Darvish (5–3) || Walker (3–2) || — || Petco Park (31,796) || 38–20
|- style="background:#fbb;"
| 59 || June 8 || @ Padres || 2–13 || Manaea (3–3) || Bassitt (4–4) || — || Petco Park (40,992) || 38–21
|- style="background:#bfb;"
| 60 || June 10 || @ Angels || 7–3 || Peterson (3–0) || Díaz (1–1) || — || Angel Stadium (31,499) || 39–21
|- style="background:#fbb;"
| 61 || June 11 || @ Angels || 6–11 || Lorenzen (6–3) || Carrasco (7–2) || — || Angel Stadium (36,408) || 39–22
|- style="background:#bfb;"24
| 62 || June 12 || @ Angels || 4–1 || Walker (4–2) || Sandoval (3–2) || Díaz (12) || Angel Stadium (36,598) || 40–22
|- style="background:#bfb;"
| 63 || June 14 || Brewers || 4–0 || Bassitt (5–4) || Houser (3–7) || — || Citi Field (28,495) || 41–22
|- style="background:#fbb;" 
| 64 || June 15 || Brewers || 2–10 || Burnes (4–4) || Peterson (3–1) || — || Citi Field (25,422) || 41–23
|- style="background:#bfb;"
| 65 || June 16 || Brewers || 5–4 || Smith (1–1) || Suter (1–1) || Díaz (13) || Citi Field (25,002) || 42–23
|- style="background:#bfb;" 
| 66 || June 17 || Marlins || 10–4 || Carrasco (8–2) || López (4–3) || — || Citi Field (36,111) || 43–23
|- style="background:#bfb;" 
| 67 || June 18 || Marlins || 3–2 || Walker (5–2) || Garrett (1–2) || Díaz (14) || Citi Field (40,021) || 44–23
|- style="background:#fbb;" 
| 68 || June 19 || Marlins || 2–6 || Alcántara (7–2) || Bassitt (5–5) || — || Citi Field (41,255) || 44–24
|- style="background:#bfb;" 
| 69 || June 20 || Marlins || 6–0 || Peterson (4–1) || Rogers (3–6) || — || Citi Field (34,947) || 45–24
|- style="background:#fbb;" 
| 70 || June 21 || @ Astros || 2–8 || Urquidy (6–3) || Williams (1–4) || — || Minute Maid Park (35,140) || 45–25
|- style="background:#fbb;" 
| 71 || June 22 || @ Astros || 3–5 || García (5–5) || Carrasco (8–3) || Pressly (14) || Minute Maid Park (35,450) || 45–26
|- style="background:#bfb;" 
| 72 || June 24 || @ Marlins || 5–3 || Walker (6–2) || Alcántara (7–3) || Díaz (15) || LoanDepot Park (11,444) || 46–26
|- style="background:#bfb;"
| 73 || June 25 || @ Marlins || 5–3 || Bassitt (6–5) || Yacabonis (0–1) || Díaz (16) || LoanDepot Park (18,722) || 47–26
|- style="background:#fbb;" 
| 74 || June 26 || @ Marlins || 2–3 || Scott (3–2) || Ottavino (2–2) || — || LoanDepot Park (19,343) || 47–27
|- style="background:#fbb;"
| 75 || June 28 || Astros || 1–9 || Valdez (8–3) || Carrasco (8–4) || — || Citi Field (36,673) || 47–28
|- style="background:#fbb;" 
| 76 || June 29 || Astros || 0–2 || Verlander (10–3) || Smith (1–2) || Pressly (16) || Citi Field (29,230) || 47–29
|-

|- style="background:#bfb;" 
| 77 || July 1 || Rangers || 4–3 || Peterson (5–1) || Otto (4–4) || Díaz (17) || Citi Field (35,639) || 48–29
|- style="background:#fbb;" 
| 78 || July 2 || Rangers || 3–7 || Pérez (7–2) || Williams (1–5) || — || Citi Field (26,494) || 48–30
|- style="background:#bfb;" 
| 79 || July 3 || Rangers || 4–1 || Carrasco (9–4) || Gray (4–4) || Díaz (18) || Citi Field (25,241) || 49–30
|- style="background:#bfb;" 
| 80 || July 4 || @ Reds || 7–4 || Walker (7–2) || Greene (3–10) || Lugo (3) || Great American Ball Park (19,533) || 50–30
|- style="background:#fbb;" 
| 81 || July 5 || @ Reds || 0–1 || Strickland (2–2) || Lugo (1–2) || — || Great American Ball Park (13,487) || 50–31
|- style="background:#bfb;" 
| 82 || July 6 || @ Reds || 8–3  || Ottavino (3–2) || Moreta (0–2) || — || Great American Ball Park (13,540) || 51–31
|- style="background:#bfb;" 
| 83 || July 7 || Marlins || 10–0 || Williams (2–5) || Castano (1–2) || — || Citi Field (30,555) || 52–31
|- style="background:#fbb;" 
| 84 || July 8 || Marlins || 2–5 || López (6–4) || Bassitt (6–6) || Scott (11) || Citi Field (25,208) || 52–32
|- style="background:#bfb;"
| 85 || July 9 || Marlins || 5–4  || Holderman (4–0) || Scott (4–3) || — || Citi Field (43,336) || 53–32
|- style="background:#fbb;"
| 86 || July 10 || Marlins || 0–2  || Bleier (1–1) || Hunter (0–1) || Scott (12) || Citi Field (34,774) || 53–33
|- style="background:#bfb;"
| 87 || July 11 || @ Braves || 4–1 || Scherzer (6–1) || Fried (9–3) || Díaz (19) || Truist Park (42,925) || 54–33
|- style="background:#fbb;"
| 88 || July 12 || @ Braves || 1–4 || Matzek (1–2) || Peterson (5–2) || Minter (4) || Truist Park (42,217) || 54–34
|- style="background:#bfb;"
| 89 || July 13 || @ Braves || 7–3 || Bassitt (7–6) || Morton (5–4) || — || Truist Park (34,879) || 55–34
|- style="background:#bfb;"
| 90 || July 14 || @ Cubs || 8–0 || Carrasco (10–4) || Thompson (7–4) || Williams (1) || Wrigley Field (34,051) || 56–34
|- style="background: #bbb;"
| — || July 15 || @ Cubs || colspan=7| Postponed (rain); rescheduled for July 16
|- style="background:#bfb;" 
| 91 || July 16 (1) || @ Cubs || 2–1  || Ottavino (4–2) || Givens (5–1) || Díaz (20) || Wrigley Field (39,219) || 57–34
|- style="background:#bfb;"
| 92 || July 16 (2) || @ Cubs || 4–3  || López (1–0) || Givens (5–2) || — || Wrigley Field (34,366) || 58–34
|- style="background:#fbb;"
| 93 || July 17 || @ Cubs || 2–3 || Wick (2–5) || Smith (1–3) || Robertson (13) || Wrigley Field (34,424) || 58–35
|-style=background:#bff
|colspan="10"|92nd All-Star Game in Los Angeles, California
|- style="background:#fbb;"
| 94 || July 22 || Padres || 1–4 || Darvish (9–4) || Scherzer (6–2) || Rogers (27) || Citi Field (36,855) || 58–36
|- style="background:#fbb;" 
| 95 || July 23 || Padres || 1–2 || Snell (2–5) || Bassitt (7–7) || Rogers (28) || Citi Field (39,359) || 58–37
|- style="background:#bfb;" 
| 96 || July 24 || Padres || 8–5 || Smith (2–3) || Musgrove (8–3) || Díaz (21) || Citi Field (35,475) || 59–37
|- style="background:#bfb;"
| 97 || July 26 || Yankees || 6–3 || Walker (8–2) || Montgomery (3–3) || Díaz (22) || Citi Field (42,364) || 60–37
|- style="background:#bfb;" 
| 98 || July 27 || Yankees || 3–2 || Lugo (2–2) || Peralta (2–3) || — || Citi Field (43,693) || 61–37
|- style="background:#bfb;"
| 99 || July 29 || @ Marlins || 6–4 || Ottavino (5–2) || Okert (5–1) || Díaz (23) || LoanDepot Park (15,131) || 62–37
|- style="background:#bfb;" 
| 100 || July 30 || @ Marlins || 4–0 || Carrasco (11–4) || Neidert (0–1) || — || LoanDepot Park (16,655) || 63–37
|- style="background:#bfb;"
| 101 || July 31 || @ Marlins || 9–3 || Walker (9–2) || López (7–6) || — || LoanDepot Park (17,449) || 64–37
|-

|- style="background:#bfb;" 
| 102 || August 1 || @ Nationals || 7–3 || Scherzer (7–2) || Corbin (4–15) || — || Nationals Park (29,034) || 65–37
|- style="background:#fbb;"
| 103 || August 2 || @ Nationals || 1–5 || Arano (1–0) || Nogosek (0–1) || — || Nationals Park (29,878) || 65–38
|- style="background:#bfb;"
| 104 || August 3 || @ Nationals || 9–5 || Bassitt (8–7) || Sánchez (0–4) || — || Nationals Park (27,851) || 66–38
|- style="background:#bfb;"
| 105 || August 4 || Braves || 6–4 || Carrasco (12–4) || Wright (13–5) || Díaz (24) || Citi Field (38,693) || 67–38
|- style="background:#fbb;"
| 106 || August 5 || Braves || 6–9 || Minter (5–3) || Walker (9–3) || — || Citi Field (40,305) || 67–39
|- style="background:#bfb;"
| 107 || August 6  || Braves || 8–5 || Peterson (6–2) || Odorizzi (4–4) || Díaz (25) || Citi Field (37,790) || 68–39
|- style="background:#bfb;"
| 108 || August 6  || Braves || 6–2 || Scherzer (8–2) || Fried (10–4) || — || Citi Field (37,452) || 69–39
|- style="background:#bfb;"
| 109 || August 7 || Braves || 5–2 || deGrom (1–0) || Strider (6–4) || Díaz (26) || Citi Field (37,717) || 70–39
|- style="background:#bfb;"
| 110 || August 8 || Reds || 5–1 || Bassitt (9–7) || Dunn (0–1) || — || Citi Field (28,448) || 71–39
|- style="background:#bfb;"
| 111 || August 9 || Reds || 6–2 || Carrasco (13–4) || Minor (1–9) || — || Citi Field (30,816) || 72–39
|- style="background:#bfb;"
| 112 || August 10 || Reds || 10–2 || Walker (10–3) || Zeuch (0–1) || — || Citi Field (36,883) || 73–39
|- style="background:#fbb;"
| 113 || August 12 || Phillies || 1–2  || Domínguez (6–3) || Givens (6–3) || Robertson (16) || Citi Field (38,467) || 73–40
|- style="background:#bfb;"
| 114 || August 13 || Phillies || 1–0 || deGrom (2–0) || Nola (8–9) || Díaz (27) || Citi Field (43,857) || 74–40
|- style="background:#bfb;"
| 115 || August 14 || Phillies || 6–0 || Bassitt (10–7) || Wheeler (11–6) || — || Citi Field (40,513) || 75–40
|- style="background:#fbb;"
| 116 || August 15 || @ Braves || 1–13 || Strider (7–4) || Carrasco (13–5) || — || Truist Park (38,380) || 75–41
|- style="background:#fbb;"
| 117 || August 16 || @ Braves || 0–5 || Morton (6–5) || Alvarez (0–1) || — || Truist Park (37,449) || 75–42
|- style="background:#bfb;"
| 118 || August 17 || @ Braves || 9–7 || Scherzer (9–2) || Odorizzi (4–5) || — || Truist Park (34,308) || 76–42
|- style="background:#fbb;"
| 119 || August 18 || @ Braves || 2–3 || Fried (11–4) || deGrom (2–1) || Jansen (28) || Truist Park (39,378) || 76–43
|- style="background:#bfb;"
| 120 || August 19 || @ Phillies || 7–2 || Bassitt (11–7) || Nola (8–10) || — || Citizens Bank Park (43,176) || 77–43
|- style="background:#bfb;"
| 121 || August 20  || @ Phillies || 8–2 || Lugo (3–2) || Wheeler (11–7) || — || Citizens Bank Park (36,809) || 78–43
|- style="background:#fbb;"
| 122 || August 20  || @ Phillies || 1–4 || Falter (1–3) || Peterson (6–3) || Robertson (17) || Citizens Bank Park (39,374) || 78–44
|- style="background:#bfb;"
| 123 || August 21 || @ Phillies || 10–9 || May (2–0) || Robertson (3–1) || Díaz (28) || Citizens Bank Park (35,801) || 79–44
|- style="background:#fbb;"
| 124 || August 22 || @ Yankees || 2–4 || Germán (2–2) || Scherzer (9–3) || Loáisiga (1) || Yankee Stadium (48,760) || 79–45
|- style="background:#fbb;"
| 125 || August 23 || @ Yankees || 2–4 || Schmidt (5–2) || Rodríguez (0–3) || Peralta (2) || Yankee Stadium (49,217) || 79–46
|- style="background:#bfb;"
| 126 || August 25 || Rockies || 3–1 || deGrom (3–1) || Feltner (2–5) || Ottavino (1) || Citi Field (37,377) || 80–46
|- style="background:#bfb;"
| 127 || August 26 || Rockies || 7–6 || Díaz (3–1) || Bard (3–4) || — || Citi Field (32,447) || 81–46
|- style="background:#bfb;"
| 128 || August 27 || Rockies || 3–0 || Peterson (7–3) || Freeland (7–9) || Ottavino (2) || Citi Field (42,617) || 82–46
|- style="background:#fbb;" 
| 129 || August 28 || Rockies || 0–1 || Márquez (7–10) || Scherzer (9–4) || Bard (27) || Citi Field (36,396) || 82–47
|- style="background:#fbb;"
| 130 || August 30 || Dodgers || 3–4 || Hembree (3–0) || Rodríguez (0–4) || Reed (1) || Citi Field (40,607) || 82–48
|- style="background:#bfb;" 
| 131 || August 31 || Dodgers || 2–1 || deGrom (4–1) || Anderson (13–3) || Díaz (29) || Citi Field (41,799) || 83–48
|-

|- style="background:#bfb;"
| 132 || September 1 || Dodgers || 5–3 || Bassitt (12–7) || Martin (4–1) || Ottavino (3) || Citi Field (36,908) || 84–48
|- style="background:#bfb;"
| 133 || September 2 || Nationals || 7–3 || Givens (7–3) || Gray (7–9) || — || Citi Field (33,630) || 85–48
|- style="background:#fbb;"
| 134 || September 3 || Nationals || 1–7 || Corbin (6–17) || Ottavino (5–3) || — || Citi Field (33,509) || 85–49
|- style="background:#fbb;"
| 135 || September 4 || Nationals || 1–7 || Fedde (6–9) || Carrasco (13–6) || — || Citi Field (31,711) || 85–50
|- style="background:#bbb;" 
| — || September 5 || @ Pirates || colspan=7| Postponed (rain); rescheduled for September 7
|- style="background:#fbb;"
| 136 || September 6 || @ Pirates || 2–8 || Keller (5–10) || Walker (10–4) || — || PNC Park (8,817) || 85–51
|- style="background:#bfb;"
| 137 || September 7  || @ Pirates || 5–1 || Bassitt (13–7) || Underwood Jr. (1–6) || — || PNC Park (8,717) || 86–51
|- style="background:#bfb;"
| 138 || September 7  || @ Pirates || 10–0 || deGrom (5–1) || Oviedo (2–2) || — || PNC Park (9,824) || 87–51
|- style="background:#fbb;"
| 139 || September 9 || @ Marlins || 3–6 || Cabrera (5–2) || Peterson (7–4) || Floro (4) || LoanDepot Park (12,692) || 87–52
|- style="background:#bfb;"
| 140 || September 10 || @ Marlins || 11–3 || Carrasco (14–6) || López (8–10) || — || LoanDepot Park (17,441) || 88–52
|- style="background:#bfb;"
| 141 || September 11 || @ Marlins || 9–3 || Walker (11–4) || Luzardo (3–7) || — || LoanDepot Park (13,234) || 89–52
|- style="background:#fbb;"
| 142 || September 12 || Cubs || 2–5 || Assad (1–1) || Bassitt (13–8) || Hughes (5) || Citi Field (28,081) || 89–53
|- style="background:#fbb;" 
| 143 || September 13 || Cubs || 1–4 || Sampson (2–5) || deGrom (5–2) || — || Citi Field (26,435) || 89–54
|- style="background:#fbb;"
| 144 || September 14 || Cubs || 3–6 || Smyly (7–8) || Peterson (7–5) || Leiter Jr. (2) || Citi Field (28,522) || 89–55
|- style="background:#bfb;"
| 145 || September 15 || Pirates || 7–1 || Carrasco (15–6) || Brubaker (3–12) || — || Citi Field (25,683) || 90–55
|- style="background:#bfb;" 
| 146 || September 16 || Pirates || 4–3 || Walker (12–4) || Keller (5–11) || Díaz (30) || Citi Field (28,928) || 91–55
|- style="background:#bfb;"
| 147 || September 17 || Pirates || 5–1 || Bassitt (14–8) || Wilson (3–9) || — || Citi Field (40,111) || 92–55
|- style="background:#bfb;" 
| 148 || September 18 || Pirates || 7–3 || Rodríguez (1–4) || Stephenson (2–2) || — || Citi Field (36,291) || 93–55
|- style="background:#bfb;" 
| 149 || September 19 || @ Brewers || 7–2 || Scherzer (10–4) || Burnes (10–8) || — || American Family Field (25,671) || 94–55
|- style="background:#bfb;" 
| 150 || September 20 || @ Brewers || 7–5 || Rodríguez (2–4) || Rogers (4–8) || Díaz (31) || American Family Field (26,319) || 95–55
|- style="background:#fbb;" 
| 151 || September 21 || @ Brewers || 0–6 || Gott (3–2) || Walker (12–5) || — || American Family Field (25,204) || 95–56
|- style="background:#bfb;"
| 152 || September 23 || @ Athletics || 9–2 || Bassitt (15–8) || Irvin (9–12) || — || Oakland Coliseum (18,107) || 96–56
|- style="background:#fbb;" 
| 153 || September 24 || @ Athletics || 4–10 || Waldichuk (1–2) || deGrom (5–3) || — || Oakland Coliseum (16,041) || 96–57
|- style="background:#bfb;" 
| 154 || September 25 || @ Athletics || 13–4 || Scherzer (11–4) || Sears (6–3) || — || Oakland Coliseum (13,942) || 97–57
|- style="background:#fbb;" 
| 155 || September 27 || Marlins || 4–6 || López (10–10) || Carrasco (15–7) || Floro (8) || Citi Field (29,067) || 97–58
|- style="background:#bfb;"
| 156 || September 28 || Marlins || 5–4  || Smith (3–3) || Floro (1–3) || — || Citi Field (28,228) || 98–58
|- style="background:#fbb;" 
| 157 || September 30 || @ Braves || 2–5 || Fried (14–7) || deGrom (5–4) || Jansen (38) || Truist Park (42,402) || 98–59
|-

|- style="background:#fbb;" 
| 158 || October 1 || @ Braves || 2–4 || Wright (21–5) || Scherzer (11–5) || Jansen (39) || Truist Park (42,561) || 98–60
|- style="background:#fbb;" 
| 159 || October 2 || @ Braves || 3–5 || Lee (5–1) || Bassitt (15–9) || Jansen (40) || Truist Park (42,713) || 98–61
|- style="background:#bbb;" 
| — || October 3 || Nationals || colspan=7| Postponed (rain); rescheduled for October 4
|- style="background:#bfb;" 
| 160 || October 4  || Nationals || 4–2 || Ottavino (6–3) || Abbott (0–5) || Díaz (32) || Citi Field (N/A) || 99–61
|- style="background:#bfb;"
| 161 || October 4  || Nationals || 8–0 || Nogosek (1–1) || Espino (0–9) || — || Citi Field (23,649) || 100–61
|- style="background:#bfb;" 
| 162 || October 5 || Nationals || 9–2 || Williams (3–5) || Fedde (6–13) || — || Citi Field (27,298) || 101–61
|-

Postseason

Game Log

|- style="background:#fbb;" 
| 1 || October 7 || Padres || 1–7 || Darvish (1–0) || Scherzer (0–1) || — || Citi Field (41,621) || 0–1
|- style="background:#bfb;"
| 2 || October 8 || Padres || 7–3 || deGrom (1–0) || Martinez (0–1) || Lugo (1) || Citi Field (42,156) || 1–1
|- style="background:#fbb;"
| 3 || October 9 || Padres || 0–6 || Musgrove (1–0) || Bassitt (0–1) || — || Citi Field (39,241) || 1–2
|-

Postseason rosters

| style="text-align:left" |
Pitchers: 0 Adam Ottavino 21 Max Scherzer 23 David Peterson 30 Joely Rodríguez  38 Tylor Megill 39 Edwin Díaz 40 Chris Bassitt 48 Jacob deGrom 60 Mychal Givens 62 Drew Smith 65 Trevor May 67 Seth Lugo 99 Taijuan Walker 
Catchers: 3 Tomás Nido 33 James McCann 50 Francisco Álvarez 
Infielders: 1 Jeff McNeil 10 Eduardo Escobar 12 Francisco Lindor 13 Luis Guillorme 20 Pete Alonso 
Outfielders: 4 Terrance Gore 6 Starling Marte 9 Brandon Nimmo 19 Mark Canha 
Designated hitters: 28 Darin Ruf 32 Daniel Vogelbach
|- valign="top"

Season notes

April
On April 29, during a game against the Philadelphia Phillies, the Mets pitchers threw a combined no-hitter, the first in the team's history. With 159 pitches, starting pitcher Tylor Megill, along with relief pitchers Drew Smith, Joely Rodríguez, Seth Lugo and closer Edwin Díaz held batters to a total of 6 walks and 13 strikeouts. This milestone is the second no-hitter in franchise history (the first was a solo effort in 2012 by Johan Santana against the St. Louis Cardinals) and the 17th combined no-hitter in MLB history. This was the second no-hitter as a manager for Buck Showalter, previously as the manager of the New York Yankees when Jim Abbott pitched a no-hitter during the 1993 season.

May
The Mets made franchise history with their biggest ninth-inning comeback in 25 years in a win over the Philadelphia Phillies on May 5. Down 7–1 entering the ninth inning, the Mets rallied with seven runs in the top of the inning to defeat the Phillies 8–7.

Statistics

Batting 
(Final statistics)
Team leaders are in bold.
Note: G = Games played; AB = At bats; R = Runs; H = Hits; 2B = Doubles; 3B = Triples; HR = Home runs; RBI = Runs batted in; SB = Stolen bases; BB = Walks; K = Strikeouts; Avg. = Batting average; OBP = On-base percentage; SLG = Slugging percentage; TB = Total bases

Source

Pitching 
(Final statistics)
Team leader are in bold.
Note: W = Wins; L = Losses; ERA = Earned run average; WHIP = Walks plus hits per inning pitched; G = Games pitched; GS = Games started; SV = Saves; IP = Innings pitched; H = Hits allowed; R = Runs allowed; ER = Earned runs allowed; BB = Walks allowed; K = Strikeouts

Source

Farm system

References

External links
 2022 New York Mets season at Baseball Reference

New York Mets seasons
New York Mets season
New York Mets
2020s in Queens
Flushing, Queens